Bega is a town in the south-east of New South Wales, Australia, in the Bega Valley Shire. It is the economic centre for the Bega Valley.

Place name

One claim is that place name Bega is derived from the local Aboriginal word meaning "big camping ground". Another claim is that it is a corruption of the word "bika" in the local Aboriginal language (one of the Yuin languages) meaning "beautiful". The local Aboriginal name for Bega before colonisation was Worerker.

History and description
The Bega region was used by the Yuin-Monaro Aboriginal people for thousands of years before Europeans arrived in the area. The clan whose country occupied the Bega vicinity were called the Worerkerbrim mitte.

Bega lies at the foot of Mumbulla Mountain, named after a Yuin elder King Jack Mumbulla, whose traditional Aboriginal name is Biamanga. The surrounding National Park is named after him as Biamanga National Park. 

The first European to come near the area was George Bass, who explored the region's coastline in December 1797 as part of his broader explorations of the Australian coast. William Tarlinton was the first European to explore the area on foot, arriving in 1829. He returned in the early 1830s and settled there, starting a cattle farm. Others who arrived in the area around the same time were the Imlay brothers, who also began farming there. Their name has since been preserved in the form of Mount Imlay National Park. Live cattle were transported to Sydney for a time, to be supplemented by tallow and hides in the early 1840s. Beef and dairy farming were carried on in the area through the 1840s, and many towns were surveyed in the 1850s.

The town of Bega itself was laid out and gazetted in December 1851. Located to the north of its present location, repeated flooding later resulted in its relocation to the higher ground south of the river. Dairy farming expanded in the region quickly throughout the 1860s, overtaking cattle farming as the predominant industry. In 1858, Tathra was used as a port for the transport of products to Sydney, and the Illawarra Steam Company was established. In 1861–62, Tathra Wharf was constructed, which allowed for the further growth and expansion of the dairy industry.

The region received a further boost in the late 1870s when gold was discovered in the Bermagui area. The Bermagui gold rush followed quickly in 1880. Two years later, in 1882, the Municipality of Bega was created. The Bega Dairy Cooperative Limited was set up in the late 1890s.

Bega is now well known for its cheese. Bega Cheese is manufactured by The Bega Co-operative Society Limited which is one of the larger Australian cheese companies. Their products are exported around the world and distributed across Australia and are available in most supermarkets and general stores.

Notable local landmarks are Bega Court House and Rosevear Jeweller's shopfront, which are both listed on the Register of the National Estate. The courthouse was built in 1881 and consists of rendered brick and iron roofs. The Rosevear shop is in Carp Street and was established circa 1899. It is listed as a notable example of Victorian commercial designers.

After years of planning, the shopping mall in Bega was built. The Sapphire Marketplace was opened on 2 December 2011.

Heritage listings 
Bega has a number of heritage-listed sites, including:
 21 Auckland Street: CBC Bank Building

Population
According to the 2021 census, there were 5,013 people in Bega.
 Aboriginal and Torres Strait Islander people made up 6.7% of the population. 
 82.3% of people were born in Australia. The next most common country of birth was England at 2.2%.   
 87.3% of people only spoke English at home. 
 The most common responses for religion were No Religion 43.8% Anglican 17% and Catholic 16.8%

Climate
Bega has an oceanic climate (Cfb), very closely bordering the humid subtropical climate (Cfa). Its relatively dry winters are owed to foehn winds, which originate from the Great Dividing Range. The town features 85.3 clear days and 139 overcast days annually.

Gallery

Notable people
 Kezie Apps – Female Rugby League Player
 Chris Atkinson – WRC driver 
 David Boyle – Rugby League Player
 Morgan Boyle – Rugby League Player
 Adam Elliott – Rugby League Player
 Dale Finucane – Rugby League Player
 Deborah Glass OBE – Victorian Ombudsman
 Thomas Jack – DJ
 Lenka – singer and songwriter
 Ky Rodwell – Rugby League Player

See also
 Bega schoolgirl murders

References

External links
 Bega Valley Shire Council web site

Towns in New South Wales
Towns in the South Coast (New South Wales)
1851 establishments in Australia
Bega Valley Shire